Limeum africanum is a species of flowering plant in the genus Limeum. It is endemic to Southern Africa. It is also known by the names common lizardfoot and koggelmandervoet; Afrikaans for the foot of a lizard from the genus Agama.

Distribution 
Limeum africanum is found in Mpumalanga, the Northern Cape and the Western Cape. It is also found in Botswana.

Subspecies 
There are 2 infraspecific named subspecies of africanum:

 Limeum africanum L. subsp. africanum
 Limeum africanum L. subsp. canescens (E.Mey. ex Fenzl) Friedrich - Found in Namaqualand.

Conservation status 
Limeum africanum is classified as Least Concern.

References

External links 
 
 

Endemic flora of South Africa
Flora of Southern Africa
Flora of the Cape Provinces
Flora of Botswana
Caryophyllales